Yusuf Kibet Biwott (born 12 November 1986) is a Kenyan long-distance runner.

Achievements

Personal bests
1500 metres - 3:34.04 min (2006)
3000 metres - 7:33.39 min (2007)
5000 metres - 12:58.49 min (2007)

External links

1986 births
Living people
Kenyan male long-distance runners
Kenyan male middle-distance runners
20th-century Kenyan people
21st-century Kenyan people